"A Brisk Young Sailor (Courted Me)" (variously known as "Bold Young Farmer", "The Alehouse", "Died For Love" and "I Wish My Baby Was Born" amongst other titles) is a traditional folk ballad (Roud # 60, Laws P25), which has been collected from all over Britain, Ireland and North America.  The song originates in England in the early 1600s.

Synopsis
A young sailor courts a young girl and wins her heart. But now he visits an alehouse in another town and entertains another. He is false and this other girl has more gold than she but that will waste along with her beauty. But 
our heroine still loves him dearly and besides she's carrying his child. Oh, what a foolish girl she was to have given her heart to a sailor.

In some versions she dies of a broken heart and in others he is not a sailor but a farmer or other unspecified young man.

Commentary
The Traditional Ballad Index states that one 1891 source claims the song was written by an F. J. Adams but the wide variety of different versions collected from a wide area not long after this would tend to contradict that theory.

Similar songs
There are several other traditional ballads which can easily be confused with "A Brisk Young Sailor". For example, "John Riley" (Roud #264/Laws N42) sometimes also goes by the same title but tells of a sailor returning to his lover after seven years to heal a broken tryst. Roud # 843 (Laws M22), "Jolly Young Sailor Boy" also tells the story of a girl falling for a sailor but in this case her father sends him away to sea, which itself has a similar plot to "Beam of Oak" (Roud 18830).

Lyrics

Recordings
Shirley Collins recorded "Died for Love" on False True Lovers (1959)
Martin Carthy recorded "Died for Love" on Prince Heathen (with Dave Swarbrick) (1969)
Tim Eriksen, Riley Baugus and Tim O'Brien performed a version called "I Wish My Baby Was Born" for the soundtrack to the film Cold Mountain (2003)
 The Be Good Tanyas included "I Wish My Baby Was Born" on the album Chinatown (2003)
 Kate Rusby recorded a version called "I Wish" on the album "Celtic Compass" (2003)
Rachel Unthank and the Winterset recorded I Wish, I Wish on The Bairns (2007)
 Eva Cassidy posthumously released A Bold Young Farmer on Somewhere (2008)

References

External links
A broadside of the ballad
The ballad with MIDI tune
Lyrics and musical score for piano and singer

Traditional ballads
Songs about sailors
English folk songs
Year of song unknown